Reign of Love also known by the name of the Arabic version of the series The Stranger of Tus ( is an epic historical drama series directed by Mehdi Fakhimzadeh, which aired on IRIB TV1 in 2000.  The series is about the life of Ali ibn Musa al-Reza, the eighth Imam of Shia Islam. This series mainly focus on his life where he was brought to Merv from Madina by order of Al-Ma'mun and the period of his deputy till martyrdom. The telefilm version of this series has also been made and broadcast.

Plot  
The story begins with the death of Harun al-Rashid, the Abbasid caliph, and the coming to power of his son Amin. In the continuation of the war between Amin and his brother Mamun, the caliphate of Mamun and the bringing of Ali ibn Musa al-Reza to Merv is shown. It also describes the important events of this period, such as the rain prayer, the Eid al-Fitr prayer, and the debates between religions.

Cast 
 Farokh Nemati as Imam Reza - without showing face, in Halo (see Aniconism in Islam)
 Mohammad Sadeghi as Al-Ma'mun
 Merila Zarei as Golnaz
 Danial Hakimi as Amr ibn Raja
 Bizhan Emkanian as Ibn Aghil
 Davoud Rashidi as Al-Fadl ibn al-Rabi
 Enayatollah Bakhshi as Isa Jalodi
 Fathali Oveisi as Raja Ibn Abi Dahhak
 Rambod Javan as Al-Amin
 Farimah Farjami as Zubaidah
 Bita Farrahi as Azardokht
 Kazem HajirAzad as Ibn Abi Imran
 Valiollah Momeni as Tahir ibn Husayn
 Mehdi Fakhimzadeh

Music
Music was by Babak Bayat and singing Mohammad Esfahani.

Awards

See also

 List of Islamic films

References

External links 
 

Iranian television series
Television series about Islam
2000s Iranian television series
2000 Iranian television series debuts
Islamic Republic of Iran Broadcasting original programming